The Wittgendorfer Wasser  is a river of Saxony, Germany. It flows into the Lusatian Neisse near Hirschfelde.

See also
List of rivers of Saxony

Rivers of Saxony
Upper Lusatia
Rivers of Germany